Anomis nigritarsis is a species of moth of the family Erebidae. It is found in Sri Lanka, India, China (Hainan), Taiwan, Borneo, Java, Sulawesi, the Moluccas, Queensland, New Caledonia, the Solomon Islands, Vanuatu, Fiji, Samoa and Tonga.

Adults of ssp. nigritarsis are uniform greyish red, of ssp. albipuncta dark, dull, brick-red and xanthochroa dark and mottled with broad areas of paler colour.

The larvae feed on Hibiscus and Urena species.

Subspecies
Anomis nigritarsis (Sri Lanka, India, Hainan, Taiwan, Borneo, Java)
Anomis nigritarsis albipuncta Snellen, 1880 (Sulawesi, Moluccas, Queensland, New Caledonia)
Anomis nigritarsis xanthochroa Butler, 1886 (Solomons, Vanuatu, Fiji, Samoa, Tonga)

References

Moths described in 1858
Catocalinae
Moths of Asia
Moths of Oceania